Beat is a 1998 Japanese film. Directed by Amon Miyamoto, the film's narrative is set in Okinawa in the 1960s, during the military occupation by the American government.  The plot was inspired by Naminoue no Maria, a novel by the Okinawan writer Eiki Matayoshi.

Beat was screened during Critics' Week at the 1998 Venice International Film Festival.

Cast
Claude Maki - Takeshi
Yuki Uchida - Michi
Dean Stapleton - Ryan
Naoto Hirata - The Youth
Judy Motomura - Maria
Toshiya Nagasawa - Kazuo
Ayako Kawahara - Lee

Crew
Amon Miyamoto - director, screenwriter
Shinya Kawai - producer
Takashige Ichise - producer
Genkichi Hasegawa - cinematographer
Hirohide Abe - editor
Hiroshi Butsuda - special effects
Makoto Ishihara - associate producer
Yuji Tsuzuki - production designer

References

External links
 
Presentation of the movie historical context
Synopsis

1998 films
Films set in Okinawa Prefecture
1990s Japanese films